The 1997 Women's South American Volleyball Championship was the 22nd edition of the Women's South American Volleyball Championship, organised by South America's governing volleyball body, the Confederación Sudamericana de Voleibol (CSV). It was held in Lima, Peru

Final standing

References

External links
CSV official website

Women's South American Volleyball Championships
South American Volleyball Championships
Volleyball
1997 in South American sport
International volleyball competitions hosted by Peru

ja:2011年バレーボール女子南米選手権